Gonolobus cundurango, is an unresolved name for a plant that might be a vine in the family Apocynaceae.

References

cundurango
Flora of Peru
Flora of Ecuador
Flora of Colombia